The 1916 Giro di Lombardia was the 12th edition of the Giro di Lombardia cycle race and was held on 5 November 1916. The race was won by Leopoldo Torricelli of the Maino team.

General classification

References

1916
Giro di Lombardia
Giro di Lombardia